Arthur Bollard Hide (1860–1933) was an English first-class cricketer and Test match umpire.

Born in Eastbourne in 1860, Hide played 115 games for Sussex as a left arm medium pace bowler between 1882 and 1890. He took 403 wickets at 19.19 with a best of 7 for 44, taking five wickets in an innings on 20 occasions. Upon his playing retirement Hide turned to umpiring, standing in the 1899 Ashes Test at Old Trafford. He died in London in 1933.

Hide's brother Jesse also played first-class cricket.

References

1860 births
English cricketers
Sussex cricketers
English Test cricket umpires
1933 deaths
North v South cricketers